Baron Glendevon, of Midhope in the County of Linlithgow, is a title in the Peerage of the United Kingdom. It was created on 16 July 1964 for the Conservative politician Lord John Hope. He was the younger twin son of Victor Hope, 2nd Marquess of Linlithgow.  the title is held by his younger son, the third Baron, who succeeded his elder brother in 2009.

Barons Glendevon (1964)
John Adrian Louis Hope, 1st Baron Glendevon (1912–1996)
Julian John Somerset Hope, 2nd Baron Glendevon (1950-2009)
Jonathan Charles Hope, 3rd Baron Glendevon (b. 1952)

There is no heir to the title.

Arms

See also
Marquess of Linlithgow
Baron Rankeillour
Hope Baronets

Notes

References
Kidd, Charles, Williamson, David (editors). Debrett's Peerage and Baronetage (1990 edition). New York: St Martin's Press, 1990, 

Baronies in the Peerage of the United Kingdom
Noble titles created in 1964
Noble titles created for UK MPs
Glendevon